Manora Fort may refer to:

 Manora Fort, Karachi, Karachi, Sindh, Pakistan
 Manora Fort, Thanjavur, Thanjavur, India

See also

 Manora, Karachi, in Karachi, Sindh, Pakistan
 Manora Island, an island in Karachi, Sindh, Pakistan
 Manora Cantonment, in Karachi, Sindh, Pakistan
 Manora, Washim, a taluka in Washim district of Maharashtra, India